Multiply is a studio album by Jamie Lidell. It was released by Warp Records in 2005. Unusually for Warp, which for many years released mainly electronic music, the album has much in common with soul and funk music.

Critical reception 

At Metacritic, which assigns a weighted average score out of 100 to reviews from mainstream critics, Multiply received an average score of 84% based on 24 reviews, indicating "universal acclaim".

Jonathan Keefe, writing for Slant, praised the album's mixture of classic soul and modern dance music while commenting on its departure from Warp's usual sound, saying "It’s hard to imagine what Warp’s post-IDM demographic might make of Multiply, but it’s an album fully deserving of finding a massive fanbase across multiple genres of more mainstream pop." 

Mark Pytlik wrote a similarly positive review for Pitchfork, stating that "Multiply represents Lidell's dramatic transformation from a knob-twiddling laptopper to a red-blooded soul singer."  Additionally, Pitchfork placed it at number 189 on its list of top 200 albums of the 2000s, calling it "a remarkable statement made by a remarkable artist."

Track listing

Personnel 
 Jamie Lidell – vocals, drums, keyboards, vibraphone, programming, production
 Mocky – bass guitar, guitar, piano, farfisa, synthesizer, tambourine, vocals, production
 Tony Buck – drums
 Daniel Raymond Gahn – drums
 Gonzales – piano
 Jordan McLean – horns
 Taylor Savvy – bass guitar
 Snax – synthesizer
 André Vida – horns
 Bill Youngman – guitar

References

External links 
 

2005 albums
Jamie Lidell albums
Warp (record label) albums